Ali Benouna (23 July 1912 in Chlef, Algeria – 6 November 1980 in Algiers, Algeria) was a former French-Algerian professional footballer.

Career
Benouna was the first Algerian and North African to play in France, playing for FC Sète and Stade Rennais in the 1930s.

He was also the first Algerian and North African to play for the France National Team, making his debut on 9 February 1936, in a 3–0 friendly loss against Czechoslovakia.

Benouna would make his second and last appearance on 8 March 1936, in a 3–0 friendly win against Belgium.

Honours
 Won the Coupe de France once with FC Sète in 1934
 Has 2 caps for the France National Team

References

External links
 
 
  

1912 births
1980 deaths
Algerian footballers
Algerian emigrants to France
French footballers
France international footballers
FC Sète 34 players
Stade Rennais F.C. players
US Boulogne players
Ligue 1 players
People from Chlef
RC Roubaix players
Association football forwards